Thomas Fairfax, 6th Lord Fairfax of Cameron (22 October 16939 December 1781), was a Scottish peer. He was the son of Thomas Fairfax, 5th Lord Fairfax of Cameron, and Catherine Colepeper, daughter of Thomas Colepeper, 2nd Baron Colepeper.

The only resident peer in late colonial America, Fairfax administered his vast Northern Neck Proprietary — a Virginia land grant dating back to 1649 — from his wilderness estate at Greenway Court, Virginia. He owned several hundred slaves on some 30 farms and derived much of his income from their labor.

Various place names in Northern Virginia and the Eastern Panhandle of West Virginia are named for himmost notably Fairfax County, Virginia, and the independent City of Fairfax.

Early life

Born in Kent, England, at Leeds Castle—owned by his maternal Culpeper ancestors since the 1630s—Lord Fairfax succeeded to his title in 1709. He was educated at Oriel College, Oxford, between 1710 and 1713 and afterward held a commission in the Royal Horse Guards (1721–1733). He was a contributor to the early newspaper The Spectator.

In 1719, Fairfax came into possession of the vast Culpeper family estates in Virginia's Northern Neck Proprietary between the Rappahannock and Potomac Rivers. These lands included a great portion of the Shenandoah and South Branch Potomac valleys, in all consisting of some 5,282,000 acres (21,380 km2). Struggling to keep up an expensive lifestyle and maintain Leeds Castle, Fairfax relied on the income from his Virginia tract, both from the sale of land and the annual quit rents, paid by planters who settled in the Northern Neck.  These rents were collected by his resident land agent, Robert "King" Carter (1662–1732). In the fall of 1732, Fairfax read Carter's obituary in the London monthly The Gentleman's Magazine and was astonished to read of the vast personal wealth Carter had accumulated, which included £10,000 in cash: this at a time when the Governor of Virginia was paid an annual salary of £200. Rather than appoint another Virginian to the position, Lord Fairfax arranged to have his cousin Colonel William Fairfax move in 1734 from Massachusetts to Virginia to serve as his resident land agent.

In North America

Lord Fairfax travelled to Virginia for the first time between 1735 and 1737 to inspect and protect his lands. In 1738, about thirty farms were established as part of his  Patterson Creek Manor near present-day Burlington, Mineral County, West Virginia. The northwestern boundary of his Northern Neck Proprietary, which had been contested by the English Privy Council, was marked in 1746 by the "Fairfax Stone" at the headwaters of the North Branch Potomac River. Returning to America in 1747, he first settled at Belvoir (present-day Fort Belvoir), an estate which had been completed by Col. Fairfax six years earlier. That year he also set aside land for his personal use at Swan Pond Manor (located near present-day Martinsburg, Berkeley County, West Virginia). He then became active in developing his lands and collecting ground rents.

Fairfax was the only resident peer in the Thirteen Colonies. In 1748, he made the acquaintance of George Washington, then a youth of 16, a distant relative of the Yorkshire Fairfax family. Impressed with Washington's energy and talents, Lord Fairfax employed him (Washington's first employment) to survey his lands lying west of the Blue Ridge.

Fairfax, a lifelong bachelor, moved out to the Shenandoah Valley in 1752. At the suggestion of his nephew Thomas Bryan Martin, he fixed his residence at a hunting lodge at Greenway Court, near White Post, Clarke County. 
Here he and Martin lived together in a style of liberal hospitality, frequently indulging in the diversion of the chase. He served as county lieutenant and as justice of the peace for Frederick County which then included Clarke.

Though an avowed Loyalist, Fairfax kept quiet and was known to be close to Washington. He was never insulted or molested.  Title to his domain, however, was confiscated during the hostilities by the Virginia Act of 1779. Less than two months after the 1781 defeat of the British army at Yorktown, the 88-year-old Fairfax died at his seat at Greenway Court. He was buried on the east side of Christ Church (Episcopal) in Winchester, Virginia.

Legacy
Lord Fairfax's title descended to his younger brother, Robert Fairfax, 7th Lord Fairfax of Cameron (also descended from the 5th Lord Fairfax of Cameron) who died at Leeds Castle in 1793. Since, but for the war, his immense domain should also have passed to Robert Fairfax, the latter was awarded £13,758 in 1792, by Act of Parliament for the relief of American Loyalists. A portion of this estate, devised to nephew Denny Martin Fairfax, was later the subject of the landmark U.S. Supreme Court case Martin v. Hunter's Lessee (1816). His younger cousin, son of his manager William Fairfax and half-brother of George William Fairfax, Rev. Bryan Fairfax, would eventually return to England to assert his claim and become the 8th Lord Fairfax of Cameron.
Fairfax County, Virginia, and the City of Fairfax, Virginia, are named for Lord Fairfax.
Fairfax and Cameron Streets in Alexandria, Virginia, are named for Lord Fairfax. The town's first survey map was made in 1749 by Lord Fairfax's young protégé George Washington.
The Fairfax Line and Fairfax Stone both bear Lord Fairfax's name.
Lord Fairfax Community College bore his name, but it was changed to Laurel Ridge Community College in July 2021.
The Swan Pond Manor Historic District encompasses land Lord Fairfax set aside in 1747 for his personal use.
Fairfax depended on hundreds of enslaved persons who worked among his 30 Virginia plantations. He was active in trading slaves and, at the age of 84, he participated in the "little talked about" activity called "bedding down with a negro wench," for which Lord Fairfax would pay a fee to the person who supplied the "wench."

Notes

Further reading
 Ruggiu, François-Joseph. "Extraction, wealth and industry: The ideas of noblesse and of gentility in the English and French Atlantics (17th–18th centuries)." History of European Ideas 34.4 (2008): 444-455 online
 Schlesinger,  Arthur M. “The Aristocracy in Colonial America.” Proceedings of the Massachusetts Historical Society, vol. 74, 1962, pp. 3–21. online 

Dictionary of American Biography
Concise Dictionary of American Biography; ed. Joseph G.E. Hopkins; Charles Scribner's Sons, New York, 1964

External links
 
Culpepper Connections! The Culpepper Family History Site 

1693 births
1781 deaths
18th-century American Episcopalians
18th-century American landowners
Alexandria, Virginia
Alumni of Oriel College, Oxford
American people of English descent
American people of Scottish descent
American planters
British North American Anglicans
Culpeper family
Fairfax County, Virginia
Thomas
Loyalists in the American Revolution from Virginia
Masters of foxhounds
People from Clarke County, Virginia
People from Leeds, Kent
Scottish representative peers
American people of Dutch descent
English emigrants
Burials in Virginia
American slave owners
Lords Fairfax of Cameron